Andrey Rublev was the reigning champion from when the tournament was last held in 2019, but lost to Adrian Mannarino in the second round in a rematch of the 2019 final.

Aslan Karatsev won the title, defeating Marin Čilić in the final, 6–2, 6–4.

Seeds
The top four seeds received a bye into the second round.

Draw

Finals

Top half

Bottom half

Qualifying

Seeds

Qualifiers

Lucky loser

Qualifying draw

First qualifier

Second qualifier

Third qualifier

Fourth qualifier

References

External links
 Main draw
 Qualifying draw

Kremlin Cup - Singles
2021 Men's Singles